A list of the films produced in Mexico in 1954 (see 1954 in film):

1954

See also
1954 in Mexico

External links

1954
Films
Lists of 1954 films by country or language